The Decima Flottiglia MAS (Decima Flottiglia Motoscafi Armati Siluranti, also known as La Decima or Xª MAS) (Italian for "10th Assault Vehicle Flotilla") was an Italian flotilla, with commando frogman unit, of the Regia Marina (Italian Royal Navy) created during the Fascist regime.

The acronym MAS also refers to various light torpedo boats used by the Regia Marina during World War I and World War II.

Decima MAS was active during the Battle of the Mediterranean and took part in a number of daring raids on Allied shipping. These operations involved surface speedboats (such as the raid on Souda Bay), human torpedoes (the raid on Alexandria) and Gamma frogmen (against Gibraltar). During the campaign, Decima MAS took part in more than a dozen operations which sank or damaged five warships (totalling 72,000 tons) and 20 merchant ships (totalling 130,000 GRT).

In 1943, after the Italian dictator Benito Mussolini was ousted, Italy left the Tripartite Pact.  Some of the Xª MAS men who were stationed in German-occupied northern and central Italy enlisted to fight for Mussolini's newly formed Italian Social Republic (Repubblica Sociale Italiana or RSI) and retained the unit title, but were primarily employed as an anti-partisan force operating on land. Other Xª MAS men in southern Italy or other Allied-occupied areas joined the Italian Co-Belligerent Navy as part of the Mariassalto (Naval Assault) unit.

Historical background
In World War I, on November 1, 1918, Raffaele Paolucci and Raffaele Rossetti of the Regia Marina rode a human torpedo (nicknamed Mignatta or "leech") into the harbour of Pula, where they sank the battleship Jugoslavija, of the navy of the State of Slovenes, Croats and Serbs, formerly the Austro-Hungarian battleship , and the freighter Wien using limpet mines. They had no underwater breathing sets, and thus had to keep their heads above water to breathe.  They were discovered and taken prisoner as they attempted to leave the harbour.

In the 1920s, sport spearfishing without breathing apparatus became popular on the Mediterranean coast of France and Italy. This spurred the development of modern swimfins, diving masks and snorkels.

In the 1930s Italian sport spearfishermen began using industrial or submarine-escape oxygen rebreathers, starting scuba diving in Italy.

Unit origins

This new type of diving came to the attention of the Regia Marina which founded the first special forces underwater frogman unit, later copied by the Royal Navy and United States Navy. Capitano di Fregata (Commander) Paolo Aloisi was the first commander of the 1ª Flottiglia Mezzi d'Assalto ("First Assault Vehicle Flotilla"), formed in 1939 as a result of the research and development efforts of Majors Teseo Tesei and Elios Toschi of the naval combat engineers. The two resurrected Paolucci's and Rossetti's concept of human torpedoes.

In 1941, Commander Vittorio Moccagatta re-organised the First Flotilla into the Decima Flottiglia MAS, and divided the unit into two parts – a surface group operating fast explosive motor boats, and a sub-surface weapons group using human torpedoes called SLC (siluri a lenta corsa or "slow-running torpedoes", but nicknamed Maiale or "Pig" by their crews), as well as "Gamma" assault swimmers (nuotatori) using limpet mines.  Moccagatta also created the frogman training school at the San Leopoldo base of the Italian Naval Academy in Livorno.

Combat record 
The Decima MAS saw action starting on June 10, 1940, when Fascist Italy entered World War II. In more than three years of war, the unit destroyed some 72,190 tons of Allied warships and 130,572 tons of Allied merchant ships. During the course of the war, the Decima MAS was awarded the Golden Medal of Military Valour and individual members were awarded a total of 29 Golden Medals of Military Valour, 104 Silver Medals of Military Valour and 33 Bronze Medals of Military Valour.

1940 

 June 10, 1940: Benito Mussolini declared war on United Kingdom.
 August 22, 1940: While preparing for an attack on the British naval base at Alexandria, Egypt, the Italian submarine  (carrying four Maiale and five two-man crews) and the support ship Monte Gargano were attacked and sunk in the Gulf of Bomba off Tobruk, Libya, by British land-based Fairey Swordfish torpedo bombers.  Teseo Tesei survived the attack, but casualties among the submarine crew were heavy.
 September 21, 1940: The Italian submarine Gondar departed La Spezia for Alexandria, carrying three Maiale and four two-man crews. The Gondar reached Alexandria on the evening of September 30, but was spotted by British and Australian destroyers, which attacked. Severely damaged, it was forced to the surface and scuttled by the crew. They were captured, along with the Decima MAS crewmen (including Elios Toschi).
 September 24, 1940: The Italian submarine , commanded by Commander Junio Valerio Borghese, departed La Spezia carrying three human torpedoes and four crews, for a planned attack on the British naval base at Gibraltar.  The operation was cancelled when the British fleet left harbour before the submarine arrived.
 October 21, 1940: Sciré departed La Spezia and sailed again to Gibraltar carrying three human torpedoes and four crews. The Decima MAS frogmen entered the harbour, but were unable to attack any ships due to technical problems with the torpedoes and breathing equipment. Only one human torpedo managed to get close to a target, the battleship Barham. The charge exploded but did not cause significant damage. The two crewmen, Gino Birindelli and Damos Paccagnini, were captured by the British. The other four (including Teseo Tesei) manage to reach Spain and returned to Italy.  Valuable experience was gained in this operation by the Decima. Gino Birindelli received the Medaglia d'Oro al Valor Militare (MOVM), his second, Damos Paccagnini received the Medaglia d'Argento al Valore Militare (MAVM).

1941 

 March 25, 1941: The Italian destroyers  and  departed Leros island in the Aegean at night, each carrying 3 small (2-ton) Motoscafo da Turismo motor assault boats of the Decima MAS.  Each MT (nicknamed barchini or "little boats") carried a 300 kg (660 lb) explosive charge in its bow. The one-pilot craft were launched by the destroyers 10 miles off Suda Bay, Crete, where several British Royal Navy warships and auxiliary ships were at anchor. The MTs were specially equipped to make their way through obstacles such as torpedo nets; the pilot steered the assault craft in a collision course at his target ship, and jumped from his boat before impact and warhead detonation.  Once inside the bay, the six boats located their targets: the heavy cruiser , a large tanker (the Norwegian Pericles of 8,300 tons), another tanker, and a cargo ship. Two MTMs hit York amidships, flooding her aft boilers and magazines. Pericles was severely damaged and settled on the bottom, while the other tanker and the cargo ship were sunk. The other barchini apparently missed their intended targets, and one of them was stranded on the beach. All six of the Italian sailors were captured. The disabled York was later scuttled in shallow waters with demolition charges by her crew before the German capture of Crete, while Pericles sank in April 1941 en route to Alexandria.
 May 25, 1941: The Sciré departed La Spezia carrying three human torpedoes. At Cadiz, Spain it secretly embarked eight Decima MAS crewmen. The torpedoes once again experienced technical problems as they unsuccessfully attempted to attack a freighter. The crew returned to Italy via Spain.
 June 26, 1941: An attack on Malta similar to the July 26, 1941 operation (see below) was planned but was canceled due to bad weather.

 July 26, 1941: Two Maiale and ten MAS boats (including six barchini) unsuccessfully attacked the port of Valletta, Malta. The force was detected early on by a British radar installation, but the British coastal batteries held their fire until the Italians approached to close range. Fifteen Decima MAS crewmen were killed (including Commander Moccagatta), and 18 were captured.  Teseo Tesei and Petty Officer  on one torpedo died by Fort St. Elmo as they attempted to destroy the outer defenses of the harbour. Lieutenant Franco Costa and sergeant Luigi Barla on the other torpedo became lost, scuttled their craft, and swam ashore at St. George's Bay two miles NW of Valletta. Their Maiale was recovered by the British, becoming the first example they had been able to examine.  All 6 MTMs, both SLCs and two MAS (MAS 451 and MAS 452) boats were lost, one of them being found adrift in open seas by the British and towed to port by a seaplane. This disaster forced the unit to make a huge reassessment of its operations. Commander Ernesto Forza was named as commander of the Decima MAS, and Borghese became leader of the sub-surface weapons group.
 September 10, 1941: The Sciré departed La Spezia carrying three human torpedoes. At Cadiz, Spain, it secretly embarked eight crewmen for them. At Gibraltar, the torpedoes sank three ships: the tankers Denbydale and Fiona Shell, and the cargo ship Durham. All six crewmen swam to Spain and returned safely to Italy, where they were decorated, as were the crew of Sciré.
 December 3, 1941: Sciré departed La Spezia carrying three human torpedoes to conduct what became the Raid on Alexandria (1941). At the island of Leros in the Aegean Sea, six Decima MAS crewmen came aboard, including Lieutenant Luigi Durand de la Penne. On December 18 Sciré released the torpedoes 1.3 miles from Alexandria commercial harbour, and they entered the harbour when the British opened the boom defence to let three of their destroyers pass. After many difficulties, de la Penne and his crewmate Emilio Bianchi successfully attached a limpet mine under , but had to surface as they attempted to leave, and were captured. They refused to answer when questioned and were detained in a compartment aboard Valiant.  Fifteen minutes before the explosion, de la Penne asked to speak to the Valiants captain and informed him of the imminent explosion but refused to give other information. He was returned to the compartment and neither he nor Bianchi were injured by the detonation of the mine. The other four torpedo-riders were also captured, but their mines sank Valiant, the battleship , and the Norwegian tanker Sagona, and badly damaged the destroyer . The two battleships sank in only a few feet of water and were subsequently re-floated. Nevertheless, they were out of action for over a year.

1942 
 April 29, 1942: The Italian submarine Ambra departed La Spezia carrying three human torpedoes. At Leros six crewmen were secretly loaded for them. On May 14 Ambra reached Alexandria and sank a British floating dock.  The Ambra was spotted and could not sink anything. All six torpedo-riders were captured.
 July 1942: Italian frogmen set up a secret base in the Italian tanker Olterra which was interned in Algeciras near Gibraltar. All materials had to be moved secretly through Spain and this limited operations.
 July 13, 1942: Twelve Italian frogmen swam from the Algeciras coast into Gibraltar harbour and set explosives, and then returned safely. Four ships were sunk.
 August 10, 1942: The Italian submarine Scirè was sunk by HMS Islay while attempting to attack the port of Haifa in British Palestine. She had 11 frogmen on board.
 August 29, 1942: Off El Daba, Egypt. The   was torpedoed at close range by an MTSM, a torpedo-carrying version of the MTM. Six of her crew were lost.   was towed to Alexandria, but soon after was declared a "constructive total loss", and was scrapped in 1946.
 December 4, 1942: The Ambra left La Spezia to attack Algiers, carrying frogmen and two human torpedoes. Ten frogmen carrying limpet mines swam with the human torpedoes, but because of the distance, they did not reach the harbour, but attacked ships outside it, sank two and damaged two others.
A British patrol boat killed one torpedo's crew (Lt. Visintini and Petty Officer Magro) with a depth charge. Their bodies were recovered, and their swimfins were taken and used by two of Gibraltar's British guard divers. Another British patrol boat spotted another torpedo, and chased and shot at it and captured its two crewmen. The remaining torpedo returned to the Olterra without its rear rider.

1943 
 May 8, 1943: Three Italian human torpedoes left the Olterra to attack Gibraltar in bad weather and sank two British freighters and an American Liberty ship. All returned safely to the Olterra.

 May 1943: Borghese becomes unit commander when Forza returned to sea
 July 25, 1943: Italian dictator Benito Mussolini was replaced by Field Marshal Pietro Badoglio as the head of the Italian Government.
 9 July 1943: Xª MAS single frogman sank or crippled the ship Kaituna (4,917 tons) at Mersin in Turkey.
 August 3, 1943: In the evening, three Italian human torpedoes left the Olterra to attack Gibraltar. They sank three cargo ships, one of them an American Liberty and returned to the Olterra. One of the Italian divers was captured.
 1 August 1943: Xª MAS single frogman sank or crippled the Norwegian cargo ship Fernplant (7,000 tons) at İskenderun in Turkey.

Armistice
 September 8, 1943:  The new Badoglio government of Italy signed an armistice with the Allies.  The Olterra was towed into Gibraltar, and the British found what had happened in it. Further attacks on Gibraltar using the new and larger replacement for the SLC (the Siluro San Bartolomeo type), and a planned raid on New York City were called off due to the Italian surrender.

Summary of Allied ships sunk or damaged by Decima MAS

Successor units

Following the armistice of Italy on September 8, 1943, the Xª MAS was disbanded.
The Badoglio government in the south of Italy under Allied occupation declared war on Germany and became a co-belligerent.
Some Decima MAS sailors joined the Allied cause to fight against Nazi Germany and what remained of the Axis as part of the Italian Co-Belligerent Navy.
A new unit was formed, led by Forza and joined by some of the pioneers such as de la Penne newly released from British POW camps.
The new unit was named Mariassalto, but continued to be an elite naval force mounting special operations at sea.

In the German-occupied north of Italy Mussolini set up the 
Italian Social Republic (Repubblica Sociale Italiana, or RSI) to continue the war as part of the Axis. Led by Borghese, Decima Flottiglia was revived, as part of the National Republican Navy (Marina Nazionale Repubblicana) of the RSI with its headquarters in Caserma del Muggiano, La Spezia. By the end of the war, it had over 18,000 members, and although Borghese conceived it as a purely naval unit, it gained a reputation as a savage pro-fascist, anti-communist, anti-resistance force in land campaigns alongside the German forces, under the command of SS General Karl Wolff.

Mariassalto

The Mariassalto was set up at Taranto alongside the British frogman force in the Mediterranean. Forza was pleased to demonstrate Italian expertise in this area to the British, and the group was also keen to be in action, though if they were caught they would almost certainly have been shot.

In June 1944 came an opportunity to take action, in Operation QWZ, a joint mission against targets in La Spezia harbour.
The attack was against the Italian cruisers Bolzano and Gorizia, which had been taken by the Germans after the Italian surrender. This was to thwart a German plan to sink them where they would block the harbour entrance. The mission also aimed to attack German U-boats in the harbour. British chariots would attack the cruisers whilst Mariassalto's Gamma Frogmen would attack U-boats penned in the harbour.
On 2 June 1944 the Italian destroyer  sailed from Bastia in Corsica to La Spezia carrying three speedboats, and Italian frogmen including Luigi Durand De La Penne, and two British chariots.
One chariot broke down and was abandoned, though the other successfully sank Bolzano. However, the Gamma men were unsuccessful in their attack on the U-boat pens. All the participants escaped, linking with partisan groups on land.

In April 1945 a final mission, Operation Toast, was planned. This was aimed at sinking the newly converted shipping liner now the aircraft carrier Aquila, just completed in Genoa.
For this Mariassalto men would make use of two British chariots, as they had none of their own SLCs available.
On 18 April 1945 the destroyer , carrying two high-speed motorboats equipped with chariots sailed from Venice for Genoa led by Captain Chavasse SOE and Forza. Both chariots were deployed and succeeded in penetrating the defences but found the hull of Aquila so encrusted with barnacles and seaweed the limpet mines could not be attached to it. The frogmen had to lay the charges on the seafloor of the outer harbour mole and when the charge exploded as planned the ship remained afloat in spite of the attack. All of the frogmen escaped safely. The German commander never put his extensive demolition plans for Genoa into action and thus Aquila was never sunk as a blockade to the harbour.

Decima MAS (RSI)

Some Xª MAS men who were in German-occupied Italy remained part of the Axis forces, joining the Italian Social Republic under the command of Captain Borghese. His reputation and that of the Xª MAS enabled him to negotiate an agreement with the German forces that gave the Xª MAS significant autonomy, allowed them to fight under an Italian flag (under the command of the Germans), and not to be employed against other Italians. Borghese was recognized as the leader of the corps.

Ideology 
The main themes in the Xª MAS's ideology became "honour" in defending Italy from the "betrayal" of the armistice with the Allies and a call to defend the territorial integrity of Italy against the Allies.
The corps had its own weekly magazine, L'orizzonte ("The Horizon"), in which authors such as Giovanni Preziosi wrote vehemently anti-Semitic articles about Jewish conspiracies. The magazine had problems in its distribution, as it was thought that Borghese's popularity among the Fascist hardliners might reduce Mussolini's influence.

Hymn

Relations with the RSI 

Relationships with the Italian Social Republic were not easy. On January 14, 1944 Benito Mussolini arrested Borghese while receiving him in Gargnano, in order to gain direct control of the Xª MAS. Word of the arrest reached the officers of the Decima, who considered marching on Mussolini's capital at Salò. However, the German command used their influence to have Borghese released, as they needed the equipment, expertise and manpower of the Xª MAS as an anti-partisan force.

Naval actions 
The Xª MAS (RSI) took little part in the war at sea. Its equipment had been abandoned in the south, and its naval activities were frustrated by Allied action.
In November 1944 four frogmen (Malacarne, Sorgetti, Bertoncin, Pavone), who had stayed under German command, were delivered by fast motorboat and swam into Livorno harbor to set up a secret sabotage base, but were captured.

Anti-partisan actions 

The Decima was mostly employed in anti-partisan actions on land, rather than against the Allies at sea. However, their actions were mostly reprisals following the massacre of soldiers of "Decima" by partisans forces – see Bardelli's homicide. Their anti-partisan actions usually took place in small villages, where the partisans were stronger.  Some examples:
Forno: 68 persons, mostly civilians and some partisans, were killed by a combination of SS members and Xª MAS forces.
Guadine: Random violence to terrorize a population believed to be supporting the rebels, almost complete destruction of the village by fire.
Borgo Ticino: Together with the SS, murder of 12 civilians, pillage and destruction of the village by fire on the grounds that three German soldiers had been wounded by partisans.
Castelletto Ticino: In order to give a demonstration of firmness against crime, a Xª MAS officer had five petty criminals publicly gunned down, having taken care to gather a large crowd in order to terrorise them.
Crocetta del Montello: Episodes of torture with whips and gasoline and summary executions of partisans.

Defense of Italian national borders
However, the Xª MAS units also earned a good combat reputation fighting on the frontline against the Allies at Anzio and on the Gothic Line. In the last months of the war Xª MAS units were dispatched to the eastern Italian border against Josip Broz Tito's partisans who marched into Istria and Venezia Giulia.

Demobilization 
On April 26, 1945, in what is now the Piazza della Repubblica in Milan, Borghese finally ordered the Xª MAS to disband. He was soon arrested by partisans, but rescued by OSS officer James Angleton, who dressed him in an American uniform and drove him to Rome for interrogation by the Allies. Borghese was tried and convicted of war crimes, and sentenced to 12 years imprisonment, but was released from jail by the Italian Supreme Court in 1949. The Americans were keenly interested in infiltrating the Italian Communist groups, something which Borghese had done, and he was enlisted to help create counterintelligence units for the Americans.

Organization of RSI Xa MAS 
Naval units
Combat swimmers and frogmen
1st Combat Group
'Barbarigo', 'Lupo' battalions
'Nuotatori Paracadutisti' Parachute battalion
'Colleoni" artillery battalion
'Freccia' Engineer battalion – 1st company only
2nd Combat Group
'Valanga' Assault Engineer battalion
'Sagittario', 'Freccia', and 'Fulmine' battalions
'Castagnacci' recruitment and replacement battalion
'Da Giussano' artillery battalion
'Freccia' engineer battalion – 2nd and 3rd companies
8 independent infantry battalions
5 independent infantry companies
Women's Auxiliary Service

After 1945

In 2006 the admiralty of the Italian republic recognized the Xth M.A.S. RSI veterans as combatants of WWII and gave the association the battle flag.

Counter-operations against Italian frogmen by British frogmen in Gibraltar was the subject of a 1958 British film The Silent Enemy based on the exploits of the team of Lionel Crabb.

Today the Comando Raggruppamento Subacquei e Incursori Teseo Tesei is the frogman corp currently serving the Italian Republic.

In popular culture
The Decima MAS’ Gibraltar operations are depicted in the 1952 Italian film I sette dell’Orsa maggiore and the 1958 British film  The Silent Enemy
The Uniforms of the Decima Flottiglia MAS are used by the collaborationists in the film Salò o le 120 giornate di Sodoma.
The Raid on Alexandria (1941) is depicted in the 1962 British film The Valiant
In the Italian film My Brother is an Only Child, set in the 1960s, a young Communist refers to the Decima Mas, and their "dungeon" on Via Tasso.
Prince Valerio Borghese escaped capital punishment after the war (Thanks to James Jesus Angleton of the CIA) in the cold war context and remained an active neo-fascist activist: He attempted a failed fascist coup in the early 1970s (the infamous golpe Borghese).
The Golpe Borghese and its leader are spoofed in a film by Mario Monicelli called Vogliamo i Colonelli (We want the Colonels) where Borghese part is played by Italian actor Ugo Tognazzi impersonating an ultra right-wing parliament representative called Tritoni (Triton or Newt). One of the best scenes features a boisterous and crazy assault diver and parachute Commando frogman called Barbacane (Giuseppe Maffioli).

See also
 

, the COMSUBIN

Notes

References

Further reading
"Frogmen First Battles" by retired U.S Captain William Schofield's book
"The Black Prince and the Sea Devils: The Story of Valerio Borghese and the Elite Units of the Decima Mas", by Jack Greene and Alessandro Massignani, Cambridge, Mass.: Da Capo Press, 2004 284 pages, hardcover
"Sea Devils" by J. Valerio Borghese, translated into English by James Cleugh, with introduction by the United States Naval Institute
 Paul Kemp : Underwater Warriors (1997)

External links
The origin of the Xa Flottiglia MAS
La Decima MAS 
 Image of Italian wartime frogman with rebreather whose breathing tube and fullface mask resemble an old type of gasmask, but with the mask's blowoff valve blanked off.

Military units and formations of Italy in World War II
Special forces of Italy
MAS fleet
Military units and formations established in 1941
Military units and formations disestablished in 1943
Military units and formations established in 1943
Military units and formations disestablished in 1945
Gibraltar in World War II
Frogman operations
1941 establishments in Italy
1943 disestablishments in Italy
1943 establishments in Italy
1945 disestablishments in Italy
Naval special forces units and formations
Disbanded marine forces
Italian Marines